Mayor of Marlborough may refer to:

Mayor of Marlborough, Massachusetts
Mayor of Marlborough, New Zealand